The Convention on Assistance in the Case of a Nuclear Accident or Radiological Emergency is a 1986 treaty of the International Atomic Energy Agency (IAEA) whereby states have agreed to provide notification to the IAEA of any assistance that they can provide in the case of a nuclear accident that occurs in another state that has ratified the treaty. Along with the Convention on Early Notification of a Nuclear Accident, it was adopted in direct response to the April 1986 Chernobyl disaster.

The Convention was concluded and signed at a special session of the IAEA general conference on 26 September 1986; the special session was called because of the Chernobyl disaster, which had occurred five months before. Significantly, the Soviet Union and the Ukrainian SSR—the states that were responsible for the Chernobyl disaster—both signed the treaty at the conference and quickly ratified it. It was signed by 68 states and the Convention entered into force on 26 February 1987 after the third ratification.

As of 2016, there are 112 states that have ratified or acceded to the Convention, plus the European Atomic Energy Community, the Food and Agriculture Organization, the World Health Organization, and the World Meteorological Organization. The states that have signed the Convention but not ratified it are Afghanistan, Côte d'Ivoire, Democratic Republic of the Congo, Holy See, Niger, North Korea, Sierra Leone, Sudan, Syria, and Zimbabwe. The states that have ratified the Convention but have since denounced it and withdrawn from the agreement are Bulgaria, Hungary, Mongolia, and Poland.

References

External links
Convention on Early Notification of a Nuclear Accident, IAEA information page.
Text of the Convention.
Signatures and ratifications.

Aftermath of the Chernobyl disaster
International Atomic Energy Agency treaties

Treaties concluded in 1986
Treaties entered into force in 1986
1986 in Austria
Treaties of Albania
Treaties of Algeria
Treaties of Argentina
Treaties of Armenia
Treaties of Australia
Treaties of Austria
Treaties of Bangladesh
Treaties of the Byelorussian Soviet Socialist Republic
Treaties of Belgium
Treaties of Bolivia
Treaties of Bosnia and Herzegovina
Treaties of Botswana
Treaties of Brazil
Treaties of Burkina Faso
Treaties of Cameroon
Treaties of Canada
Treaties of Chile
Treaties of the People's Republic of China
Treaties of Colombia
Treaties of Costa Rica
Treaties of Croatia
Treaties of Cuba
Treaties of Cyprus
Treaties of the Czech Republic
Treaties of Czechoslovakia
Treaties of Denmark
Treaties of Egypt
Treaties of El Salvador
Treaties of Estonia
Treaties of Finland
Treaties of France
Treaties of Gabon
Treaties of West Germany
Treaties of East Germany
Treaties of Greece
Treaties of Guatemala
Treaties of Iceland
Treaties of India
Treaties of Indonesia
Treaties of Iran
Treaties of Ba'athist Iraq
Treaties of Ireland
Treaties of Israel
Treaties of Italy
Treaties of Japan
Treaties of Jordan
Treaties of Kazakhstan
Treaties of South Korea
Treaties of Kuwait
Treaties of Laos
Treaties of Latvia
Treaties of Lebanon
Treaties of the Libyan Arab Jamahiriya
Treaties of Liechtenstein
Treaties of Lithuania
Treaties of Luxembourg
Treaties of Malaysia
Treaties of Mali
Treaties of Mauritania
Treaties of Mauritius
Treaties of Mexico
Treaties of Monaco
Treaties of Montenegro
Treaties of Morocco
Treaties of Mozambique
Treaties of the Netherlands
Treaties of New Zealand
Treaties of Nicaragua
Treaties of Nigeria
Treaties of Norway
Treaties of Oman
Treaties of Pakistan
Treaties of Panama
Treaties of Paraguay
Treaties of Peru
Treaties of the Philippines
Treaties of Portugal
Treaties of Qatar
Treaties of Moldova
Treaties of Romania
Treaties of the Soviet Union
Treaties of Saint Vincent and the Grenadines
Treaties of Saudi Arabia
Treaties of Senegal
Treaties of Serbia and Montenegro
Treaties of Singapore
Treaties of Slovakia
Treaties of Slovenia
Treaties of South Africa
Treaties of Spain
Treaties of Sri Lanka
Treaties of Sweden
Treaties of Switzerland
Treaties of Tajikistan
Treaties of Thailand
Treaties of North Macedonia
Treaties of Tunisia
Treaties of Turkey
Treaties of the Ukrainian Soviet Socialist Republic
Treaties of the United Arab Emirates
Treaties of the United Kingdom
Treaties of Tanzania
Treaties of the United States
Treaties of Uruguay
Treaties of Vietnam
Treaties entered into by the European Atomic Energy Community
Treaties of Yugoslavia
Treaties extended to Aruba
Treaties extended to the Netherlands Antilles
Treaties entered into by the World Health Organization
Treaties of Lesotho
Treaties entered into by the Food and Agriculture Organization
Treaties entered into by the World Meteorological Organization